Mylène Demongeot (born Marie-Hélène Demongeot; 29 September 1935 – 1 December 2022) was a French film, television and theatre actress and author with a career spanning seven decades and more than 100 credits in French, Italian, English and Japanese speaking productions. Demongeot became a star at age 21 with her portrayal of Abigail Williams in The Crucible (1957) which garnered her a BAFTA Award for Most Promising Newcomer to Leading Film Roles nomination and the best actress prize at the socialist Karlovy Vary International Film Festival. Some other notable film roles include Elsa in Otto Preminger's Bonjour Tristesse (1958), alongside Deborah Kerr and David Niven, and as Milady de Winter in Les Trois Mousquetaires (1961).

A "veteran of cinema" who started as one of the blond sex symbols of the 1950s and 1960s, she managed to avoid typecasting by exploring many film genres including thrillers, westerns, comedies, swashbucklers, period films and even pepla, such as Romulus and the Sabines (1961) opposite Roger Moore or Gold for the Caesars (1963).

Demongeot also has a cult following based on the Fantomas trilogy, as Hélène Gurn opposite Louis de Funès and Jean Marais: Fantômas (1964), Fantômas Unleashed (1965) and Fantômas Against Scotland Yard (1967). Thirty years later, she starred again in another one of France's most successful comedy trilogies as Madame Pic in Fabien Onteniente's Camping (2006), Camping 2 (2010) and Camping 3 (2016).

She was twice nominated for Best Supporting Actress at the César Awards for 36 Quai des Orfèvres (2004) and French California (2006). 
In 2007, she was made a Commander of the Ordre des Arts et de Lettres of the French Republic.
In 2017, she was inducted into the Légion d'Honneur by ethologist and neurologist Boris Cyrulnik, with the rank of Chevalier. 

She remained popular until her passing from peritoneal cancer. At the time of her death, she was starring in Thomas Gilou's film Maison de retraite (2022) alongside Gérard Depardieu, one of the biggest box office hits of 2022 in France. Through an Élysée Palace official tribune, President Emmanuel Macron paid a long tribute to her which included : "we salute the career of a great figure in the French Seventh Art, who knew how to shine in all its genres to move all French people".

Early life
Demongeot was born in September 1935 in Nice, Alpes-Maritimes, the daughter and only child of Alfred Jean Demongeot, born Nice, 30 January 1897 (himself the son of Marie Joseph Marcel Demongeot, career soldier, and Clotilde Faussonne di Clavesana, an Italian contessa) and Claudia Troubnikova, born 17 May 1904 in Kharkiv (Ukraine, Russian Empire). Her parents, both actors themselves, had met in Shanghai, China, where her half-brother, Léonid Ivantov, from the first marriage of her mother, was born, in Harbin on 17 December 1923.

Like hundreds of other major European figures of stage and screen, she trained at the 'Cours Simon' in Paris where her classmates included Jean-Pierre Cassel, Claude Berri and Guy Bedos.  She was a classically trained pianist and her first ambition was of becoming a professional.

Career

In the United Kingdom she appeared in several comedies, including It's A Wonderful World (1956) and Upstairs and Downstairs (1959).

Between September 2013 and June 2014, she was a columnist member of the radio show Les Grosses Têtes by Philippe Bouvard on RTL.

Personal life
Demongeot was married to director Marc Simenon from 1968 until his death in 1999. She resided in a country house in Mayenne surrounded by animals.

Demongeot was the victim of a financial scam set up by her account manager who stole €2 million from her, money which was used to make loans to numerous high-profile personalities, like Isabelle Adjani, Alexandre Arcady or Samy Naceri. Justice took hold of the case in June 2012 and two banks were found guilty. She recounts these years of proceedings in her book Très chers escrocs… (2019, English: Very Dear Crooks…).

Demongeot died of primary peritoneal cancer on 1 December 2022, at the age of 87.

Quotes 

Among the quotes on or from her colleagues, are found:
 Brigitte Bardot wrote in one of her books: "Mylène was my little cinema sister, then became my combat sister, a libra like me, she has always loved animals, even going so far as to save a baby lion from set that she brought back to the hotel which hosted her during the filming".
 Arthur Miller wrote: "Mylene Demongeot was [in The Crucible] truly beautiful, and so bursting with real sexuality as to become a generalized force whose effects on the community transcended herself."
Demongeot met Gary Cooper at the opening of the first escalator to be installed in a cinema, at the Rex Theatre in Paris, on 7 June 1957. She declared in a filmed interview: "Gary Cooper was sublime, there I have to say, now he, was part of the stars, Gary Cooper, Cary Grant, John Wayne, those great Americans who I've met really were unbelievable guys, there aren't any like them anymore."
On David Niven she said in a filmed interview: "He was like a lord, he was part of those great actors who were extraordinary like Dirk Bogarde, individuals with lots of class, elegance and humour. I only saw David get angry once. Preminger had discharged him for the day but eventually asked to get him. I said, sir, you had discharged him, he left for Deauville to gamble at the casino. So we rented a helicopter so they immediately went and grabbed him. Two hours later, he was back, full of rage. There I saw David lose his British phlegm, his politeness and class. It was royal. [Laughs]."

Filmography

Theater

Bibliography

References

External links

Mylène Demongeot at AlloCiné
Mylène Demongeot - Personal Website

1935 births
2022 deaths
Deaths from peritoneal cancer
Deaths from cancer in France
People from Nice
French film actresses
Eastern Orthodox Christians from France
20th-century French actresses
21st-century French actresses
French people of Ukrainian descent
Commandeurs of the Ordre des Arts et des Lettres
Chevaliers of the Légion d'honneur